These are lists of North American place name etymologies:

 Mexican state name etymologies
 Canadian provincial name etymologies
 Origins of names of cities in Canada
 List of non-US places that have a US place named after them
 U.S. state name etymologies
 Lists of U.S. county name etymologies
 List of Alabama county name etymologies
 List of Alaska borough and census area name etymologies
 List of Arizona county name etymologies
 List of Arkansas county name etymologies
 List of California county name etymologies
 Etymologies of place names in Los Angeles, California
 Etymologies of street names in San Francisco, California
 List of Colorado county name etymologies
 List of Connecticut county name etymologies
 List of Delaware county name etymologies
 List of Florida county name etymologies
 List of Georgia county name etymologies
 List of Hawaii county name etymologies
 List of Idaho county name etymologies
 List of Illinois county name etymologies
 List of Indiana county name etymologies
 List of Iowa county name etymologies
 List of Kansas county name etymologies
 List of Kentucky county name etymologies
 List of Louisiana parish name etymologies
 List of Maine county name etymologies
 List of Maryland county name etymologies
 List of Massachusetts county name etymologies
 List of Michigan county name etymologies
 List of Minnesota county name etymologies
 List of Mississippi county name etymologies
 List of Missouri county name etymologies
 List of Montana county name etymologies
 List of Nebraska county name etymologies
 List of Nevada county name etymologies
 List of New Hampshire county name etymologies
 List of New Jersey county name etymologies
Etymologies of place names in Hudson County, New Jersey
Toponymy of Bergen, New Netherland
 List of New Mexico county name etymologies  
 List of New York county name etymologies
 List of North Carolina county name etymologies
 List of North Dakota county name etymologies
 List of Ohio county name etymologies
 List of Oklahoma county name etymologies
 List of Oregon county name etymologies
 List of Pennsylvania county name etymologies
 Etymologies of place names in Philadelphia, Pennsylvania
 List of Rhode Island county name etymologies
 List of South Carolina county name etymologies
 List of South Dakota county name etymologies
 List of Tennessee county name etymologies
 List of Texas county name etymologies
 List of Texas county seat name etymologies
 List of Utah county name etymologies
 List of Vermont county name etymologies 
 List of Virginia county name etymologies
 List of Washington county name etymologies
 List of West Virginia county name etymologies
 List of Wisconsin county name etymologies
 List of Wyoming county name etymologies

Lists of North American place name etymologies